Events from the year 1640 in Ireland.

Incumbent
Monarch: Charles I

Events
5 December – John Atherton, Church of Ireland Bishop of Waterford and Lismore, and his proctor are executed on a charge of buggery, on Saint Stephen's Green, Dublin.
Approximate date – Dubhaltach Mac Fhirbhisigh transcribes the only surviving copy of the Chronicon Scotorum.

Arts and literature
17 March (St. Patrick's Day) – Henry Burnell's play Landgartha premieres at the Werburgh Street Theatre in Dublin. It is one of the earliest dramatic works from a native Irish playwright.
James Shirley's play Saint Patrick for Ireland is published. The author returns to England around 16 April.

Births
29 June – Elizabeth Stanhope, Countess of Chesterfield (d. 1665 in England)
Thomas Beecher, politician and soldier (d. 1709)
Charles Molloy, lawyer (d. 1690)
Approximate date
Thomas Knox, politician (d. 1728)
Philip Og O'Reilly, politician (d. 1703)

Deaths
5 December – John Atherton, Bishop of Waterford and Lismore (b. 1598)

References

 
Ireland
Years of the 17th century in Ireland